National Highway 517 (NH 517) is a national highway in India, running from Gairkata to Dhupguri in the state of West Bengal. It is a secondary route of National Highway 17. This route was earlier part of old national highway 31. This national highway is also part of Asian Highway 48.

Route
NH517 connects Gairkata and Dhupguri in the state of West Bengal.

Junctions  

  Terminal near Gairkata.
  near Dhupguri.

See also
 List of National Highways in India
 List of National Highways in India by state

References

External links
 NH 517 on OpenStreetMap

National highways in India
National Highways in West Bengal